Michael Christian (born 21 August 1964) is a former Australian rules footballer and media personality from Busselton, Western Australia who played for East Perth in the West Australian Football League (WAFL) and Collingwood in the Victorian Football League/Australian Football League (VFL/AFL).

Christian played 82 games for East Perth in the WAFL from 1981 to 1986 and then crossed to Collingwood to play out his football career. He played at centre half-back for the majority of his career, but was also used sparingly as a forward. Christian was a member of Collingwood's 1990 premiership side and represented the West Australian team on three occasions.

After retiring, Christian became a football commentator and has commentated on radio for Triple M, Geelong station K-Rock (3GL) and 3AW, as well as for Network Ten. He hosted the breakfast program, Prime Time Sports Interactive, on Sport 927 with Angela Pippos and The Fifth Quarter, a post-match show following Saturday night AFL games, between 2004 and 2007 with Andrew Maher and from 2008 to 2011, with rotating expert commentators Michael Voss, Malcolm Blight or Luke Darcy.

Christian also commentated on weightlifting events at the 2010 Commonwealth Games.

He compered The Final Siren, a Sunday night football review show, in 2011.

Under reformed procedures introduced by the AFL, Christian was appointed Match Review Officer, the AFL's sole adjudicator for the Match Review Panel, in 2017.

References

External links

Elite Sports Profile – Michael Christian

Australian rules footballers from Western Australia
Collingwood Football Club players
Collingwood Football Club Premiership players
East Perth Football Club players
Australian radio personalities
Australian television personalities
Australian rules football commentators
1963 births
Living people
People from Busselton
Western Australian State of Origin players
One-time VFL/AFL Premiership players